Serbo-Croatian – also called Serbo-Croat, Serbo-Croat-Bosnian (SCB), Bosnian-Croatian-Serbian (BCS), and Bosnian-Croatian-Montenegrin-Serbian (BCMS) – is a South Slavic language and the primary language of Serbia, Croatia, Bosnia and Herzegovina, and Montenegro. It is a pluricentric language with four mutually intelligible standard varieties, namely Serbian, Croatian, Bosnian, and Montenegrin.

South Slavic languages historically formed a continuum. The turbulent history of the area, particularly due to expansion of the Ottoman Empire, resulted in a patchwork of dialectal and religious differences. Due to population migrations, Shtokavian became the most widespread dialect in the western Balkans, intruding westwards into the area previously occupied by Chakavian and Kajkavian (which further blend into Slovenian in the northwest). Bosniaks, Croats and Serbs differ in religion and were historically often part of different cultural circles, although a large part of the nations have lived side by side under foreign overlords. During that period, the language was referred to under a variety of names, such as "Slavic" in general or "Serbian", "Croatian" or "Bosnian" in particular. In a classicizing manner, it was also referred to as "Illyrian".

The process of linguistic standardization of Serbo-Croatian was originally initiated in the mid-19th-century Vienna Literary Agreement by Croatian and Serbian writers and philologists, decades before a Yugoslav state was established. From the very beginning, there were slightly different literary Serbian and Croatian standards, although both were based on the same dialect of Shtokavian, Eastern Herzegovinian. In the 20th century, Serbo-Croatian served as the official language of the Kingdom of Yugoslavia (when it was called "Serbo-Croato-Slovenian"), and later as one of the official languages of the Socialist Federal Republic of Yugoslavia. The breakup of Yugoslavia affected language attitudes, so that social conceptions of the language separated along ethnic and political lines. Since the breakup of Yugoslavia, Bosnian has likewise been established as an official standard in Bosnia and Herzegovina, and there is an ongoing movement to codify a separate Montenegrin standard.

Like other South Slavic languages, Serbo-Croatian has a simple phonology, with the common five-vowel system and twenty-five consonants. Its grammar evolved from Common Slavic, with complex inflection, preserving seven grammatical cases in nouns, pronouns, and adjectives. Verbs exhibit imperfective or perfective aspect, with a moderately complex tense system. Serbo-Croatian is a pro-drop language with flexible word order, subject–verb–object being the default. It can be written in either localized variants of Latin (Gaj's Latin alphabet, Montenegrin Latin) or Cyrillic (Serbian Cyrillic, Montenegrin Cyrillic), and the orthography is highly phonemic in all standards.

Name
Serbo-Croatian is typically referred to by names of its standardized varieties: Serbian, Croatian, Bosnian and Montenegrin; it is rarely referred to by names of its sub-dialects, such as Bunjevac.

In the language itself, it is typically known as  "Serbo-Croatian",  "Croato-Serbian", or informally  "ours".

Throughout the history of the South Slavs, the vernacular, literary, and written languages (e.g. Chakavian, Kajkavian, Shtokavian) of the various regions and ethnicities developed and diverged independently. Prior to the 19th century, they were collectively called "Illyric", "Slavic", "Slavonian", "Bosnian", "Dalmatian", "Serbian" or "Croatian". Since the nineteenth century the term Illyrian or Illyric was used quite often (thus creating confusion with the Illyrian language). Although the word Illyrian was used on a few occasions before, its widespread usage began after Ljudevit Gaj and several other prominent linguists met at Ljudevit Vukotinović's house to discuss the issue in 1832. The term Serbo-Croatian was first used by Jacob Grimm in 1824, popularized by the Viennese philologist Jernej Kopitar in the following decades, and accepted by Croatian Zagreb grammarians in 1854 and 1859. At that time, Serb and Croat lands were still part of the Ottoman and Austrian Empires. Officially, the language was called variously Serbo-Croat, Croato-Serbian, Serbian and Croatian, Croatian and Serbian, Serbian or Croatian, Croatian or Serbian.  Unofficially, Serbs and Croats typically called the language "Serbian" or "Croatian", respectively, without implying a distinction between the two, and again in independent Bosnia and Herzegovina, "Bosnian", "Croatian", and "Serbian" were considered to be three names of a single official language. Croatian linguist Dalibor Brozović advocated the term Serbo-Croatian as late as 1988, claiming that in an analogy with Indo-European, Serbo-Croatian does not only name the two components of the same language, but simply charts the limits of the region in which it is spoken and includes everything between the limits ('Bosnian' and 'Montenegrin'). Today, use of the term "Serbo-Croatian" is controversial due to the prejudice that nation and language must match. It is still used for lack of a succinct alternative, though alternative names have emerged, such as Bosnian/Croatian/Serbian (BCS), which is often seen in political contexts such as the International Criminal Tribunal for the former Yugoslavia.

History

Early development 

In the 9th century, Old Church Slavonic was adopted as the language of the liturgy in churches serving various Slavic nations. This language was gradually adapted to non-liturgical purposes and became known as the Croatian version of Old Slavonic. The two variants of the language, liturgical and non-liturgical, continued to be a part of the Glagolitic service as late as the middle of the 19th century. The earliest known Croatian Church Slavonic Glagolitic manuscripts are the Glagolita Clozianus and the Vienna Folia from the 11th century.

The beginning of written Serbo-Croatian can be traced from the tenth century and on when Serbo-Croatian medieval texts were written in five scripts: Latin, Glagolitic, Early Cyrillic, Bosnian Cyrillic (bosančica/bosanica), and Arebica, the last principally by Bosniak nobility. Serbo-Croatian competed with the more established literary languages of Latin and Old Slavonic in the west and Persian and Arabic in the east.

Old Slavonic developed into the Serbo-Croatian variant of Church Slavonic between the 12th and 16th centuries.

Among the earliest attestations of Serbo-Croatian are: the Humac tablet, dating from the 10th or 11th century, written in Bosnian Cyrillic and Glagolitic; the Plomin tablet, dating from the same era, written in Glagolitic; the Valun tablet, dated to the 11th century, written in Glagolitic and Latin; and the Inscription of Župa Dubrovačka, a Glagolitic tablet dated to the 11th century.

The Baška tablet from the late 11th century was written in Glagolitic. It is a large stone tablet found in the small Church of St. Lucy, Jurandvor on the Croatian island of Krk that contains text written mostly in Chakavian in the Croatian angular Glagolitic script.

The Charter of Ban Kulin of 1189, written by Ban Kulin of Bosnia, was an early Shtokavian text, written in Bosnian Cyrillic.

The luxurious and ornate representative texts of Serbo-Croatian Church Slavonic belong to the later era, when they coexisted with the Serbo-Croatian vernacular literature. The most notable are the "Missal of Duke Novak" from the Lika region in northwestern Croatia (1368), "Evangel from Reims" (1395, named after the town of its final destination), Hrvoje's Missal from Bosnia and Split in Dalmatia (1404), and the first printed book in Serbo-Croatian, the Glagolitic Missale Romanum Glagolitice (1483).

During the 13th century Serbo-Croatian vernacular texts began to appear, the most important among them being the "Istrian land survey" of 1275 and the "Vinodol Codex" of 1288, both written in the Chakavian dialect.

The Shtokavian dialect literature, based almost exclusively on Chakavian original texts of religious provenance (missals, breviaries, prayer books) appeared almost a century later. The most important purely Shtokavian vernacular text is the Vatican Croatian Prayer Book (c. 1400).

Both the language used in legal texts and that used in Glagolitic literature gradually came under the influence of the vernacular, which considerably affected its phonological, morphological, and lexical systems. From the 14th and the 15th centuries, both secular and religious songs at church festivals were composed in the vernacular.

Writers of early Serbo-Croatian religious poetry (začinjavci) gradually introduced the vernacular into their works. These začinjavci were the forerunners of the rich literary production of the 16th-century literature, which, depending on the area, was Chakavian-, Kajkavian-, or Shtokavian-based. The language of religious poems, translations, miracle and morality plays contributed to the popular character of medieval Serbo-Croatian literature.

One of the earliest dictionaries, also in the Slavic languages as a whole, was the Bosnian–Turkish Dictionary of 1631 authored by Muhamed Hevaji Uskufi and was written in the Arebica script.

Standardization 

In the mid-19th century, Serbian (led by self-taught writer and folklorist Vuk Stefanović Karadžić) and most Croatian writers and linguists (represented by the Illyrian movement and led by Ljudevit Gaj and Đuro Daničić), proposed the use of the most widespread dialect, Shtokavian, as the base for their common standard language. Karadžić standardised the Serbian Cyrillic alphabet, and Gaj and Daničić standardized the Croatian Latin alphabet, on the basis of vernacular speech phonemes and the principle of phonological spelling. In 1850 Serbian and Croatian writers and linguists signed the Vienna Literary Agreement, declaring their intention to create a unified standard. Thus a complex bi-variant language appeared, which the Serbs officially called "Serbo-Croatian" or "Serbian or Croatian" and the Croats "Croato-Serbian", or "Croatian or Serbian". Yet, in practice, the variants of the conceived common literary language served as different literary variants, chiefly differing in lexical inventory and stylistic devices. The common phrase describing this situation was that Serbo-Croatian or "Croatian or Serbian" was a single language. In 1861, after a long debate, the Croatian Sabor put up several proposed names to a vote of the members of the parliament; "Yugoslavian" was opted for by the majority and legislated as the official language of the Triune Kingdom. The Austrian Empire, suppressing Pan-Slavism at the time, did not confirm this decision and legally rejected the legislation, but in 1867 finally settled on "Croatian or Serbian" instead. During the Austro-Hungarian occupation of Bosnia and Herzegovina, the language of all three nations in this territory was declared "Bosnian" until the death of administrator von Kállay in 1907, at which point the name was changed to "Serbo-Croatian".

With unification of the first the Kingdom of the Serbs, Croats, and Slovenes – the approach of Karadžić and the Illyrians became dominant. The official language was called "Serbo-Croato-Slovenian" (srpsko-hrvatsko-slovenački) in the 1921 constitution. In 1929, the constitution was suspended, and the country was renamed the Kingdom of Yugoslavia, while the official language of Serbo-Croato-Slovene was reinstated in the 1931 constitution.

In June 1941, the Nazi puppet Independent State of Croatia began to rid the language of "Eastern" (Serbian) words, and shut down Serbian schools. The totalitarian dictatorship introduced a language law that promulgated Croatian linguistic purism as a policy that tried to implement a complete elimination of Serbisms and internationalisms.

On January 15, 1944, the Anti-Fascist Council of the People's Liberation of Yugoslavia (AVNOJ) declared Croatian, Serbian, Slovene, and Macedonian to be equal in the entire territory of Yugoslavia. In 1945 the decision to recognize Croatian and Serbian as separate languages was reversed in favor of a single Serbo-Croatian or Croato-Serbian language. In the Communist-dominated second Yugoslavia, ethnic issues eased to an extent, but the matter of language remained blurred and unresolved.

In 1954, major Serbian and Croatian writers, linguists and literary critics, backed by Matica srpska and Matica hrvatska signed the Novi Sad Agreement, which in its first conclusion stated: "Serbs, Croats and Montenegrins share a single language with two equal variants that have developed around Zagreb (western) and Belgrade (eastern)". The agreement insisted on the equal status of Cyrillic and Latin scripts, and of Ekavian and Ijekavian pronunciations. It also specified that Serbo-Croatian should be the name of the language in official contexts, while in unofficial use the traditional Serbian and Croatian were to be retained. Matica hrvatska and Matica srpska were to work together on a dictionary, and a committee of Serbian and Croatian linguists was asked to prepare a pravopis. During the sixties both books were published simultaneously in Ijekavian Latin in Zagreb and Ekavian Cyrillic in Novi Sad. Yet Croatian linguists claim that it was an act of unitarianism. The evidence supporting this claim is patchy: Croatian linguist Stjepan Babić complained that the television transmission from Belgrade always used the Latin alphabet— which was true, but was not proof of unequal rights, but of frequency of use and prestige. Babić further complained that the Novi Sad Dictionary (1967) listed side by side words from both the Croatian and Serbian variants wherever they differed, which one can view as proof of careful respect for both variants, and not of unitarism. Moreover, Croatian linguists criticized those parts of the Dictionary for being unitaristic that were written by Croatian linguists. And finally, Croatian linguists ignored the fact that the material for the Pravopisni rječnik came from the Croatian Philological Society. Regardless of these facts, Croatian intellectuals brought the Declaration on the Status and Name of the Croatian Literary Language in 1967. On occasion of the publication's 45th anniversary, the Croatian weekly journal Forum published the Declaration again in 2012, accompanied by a critical analysis.

West European scientists judge the Yugoslav language policy as an exemplary one: although three-quarters of the population spoke one language, no single language was official on a federal level. Official languages were declared only at the level of constituent republics and provinces, and very generously: Vojvodina had five (among them Slovak and Romanian, spoken by 0.5 per cent of the population), and Kosovo four (Albanian, Turkish, Romany and Serbo-Croatian). Newspapers, radio and television studios used sixteen languages, fourteen were used as languages of tuition in schools, and nine at universities. Only the Yugoslav Army used Serbo-Croatian as the sole language of command, with all other languages represented in the army's other activities—however, this is not different from other armies of multilingual states, or in other specific institutions, such as international air traffic control where English is used worldwide. All variants of Serbo-Croatian were used in state administration and republican and federal institutions. Both Serbian and Croatian variants were represented in respectively different grammar books, dictionaries, school textbooks and in books known as pravopis (which detail spelling rules). Serbo-Croatian was a kind of soft standardisation. However, legal equality could not dampen the prestige Serbo-Croatian had: since it was the language of three quarters of the population, it functioned as an unofficial lingua franca. And within Serbo-Croatian, the Serbian variant, with twice as many speakers as the Croatian, enjoyed greater prestige, reinforced by the fact that Slovene and Macedonian speakers preferred it to the Croatian variant because their languages are also Ekavian. This is a common situation in other pluricentric languages, e.g. the variants of German differ according to their prestige, the variants of Portuguese too. Moreover, all languages differ in terms of prestige: "the fact is that languages (in terms of prestige, learnability etc.) are not equal, and the law cannot make them equal".

Modern developments 
In 2017, the "Declaration on the Common Language" (Deklaracija o zajedničkom jeziku) was signed by a group of NGOs and linguists from former Yugoslavia. It states that all standardized variants belong to a common polycentric language with equal status.

Demographics 

About  million people declare their native language as either 'Bosnian', 'Croatian', 'Serbian', 'Montenegrin', or 'Serbo-Croatian'.

Serbian is spoken by  million people around the world, mostly in Serbia ( million), Bosnia and Herzegovina ( million), and Montenegro. Serbian minorities are found in Kosovo, North Macedonia and in Romania. In Serbia, there are about 760,000 second-language speakers of Serbian, including Hungarians in Vojvodina and the 400,000 estimated Roma. In Kosovo, Serbian is spoken by the members of the Serbian minority which approximates between 70,000 and 100,000. Familiarity of Kosovo Albanians with Serbian varies depending on age and education, and exact numbers are not available.

A small Croatian minority that lives in Italy, known as Molise Croats, have somewhat preserved traces of Croatian. In Croatia, 170,000, mostly Italians and Hungarians, use it as a second language.

Montenegrin is spoken by  people globally. The notion of Montenegrin as a separate standard from Serbian is relatively recent. In the 2011 census, around 229,251 Montenegrins, of the country's 620,000, declared Montenegrin as their native language. That figure is likely to increase, due to the country's independence and strong institutional backing of the Montenegrin language.

Serbo-Croatian is also a second language of many Slovenians and Macedonians, especially those born during the time of Yugoslavia. According to the 2002 Census, Serbo-Croatian and its variants have the largest number of speakers of the minority languages in Slovenia.

Outside the Balkans, there are over two million native speakers of the language(s), especially in countries which are frequent targets of immigration, such as Australia, Austria, Brazil, Canada, Chile, Germany, Hungary, Italy, Sweden, and the United States.

Grammar 

Serbo-Croatian is a highly inflected language. Traditional grammars list seven cases for nouns and adjectives: nominative, genitive, dative, accusative, vocative, locative, and instrumental, reflecting the original seven cases of Proto-Slavic, and indeed older forms of Serbo-Croatian itself. However, in modern Shtokavian the locative has almost merged into dative (the only difference is based on accent in some cases), and the other cases can be shown declining; namely:
 For all nouns and adjectives, the instrumental, dative, and locative forms are identical (at least orthographically) in the plural: ženama, ženama, ženama; očima, očima, očima; riječima, riječima, riječima.
 There is an accentual difference between the genitive singular and genitive plural of masculine and neuter nouns, which are otherwise homonyms (seljáka, seljaka) except that on occasion an "a" (which might or might not appear in the singular) is filled between the last letter of the root and the genitive plural ending (kapitalizma, kapitalizama).
 The old instrumental ending "ju" of the feminine consonant stems and in some cases the "a" of the genitive plural of certain other sorts of feminine nouns is fast yielding to "i": noći instead of noćju, borbi instead of boraba and so forth.
 Almost every Shtokavian number is indeclinable, and numbers after prepositions have not been declined for a long time.

Like most Slavic languages, there are mostly three genders for nouns: masculine, feminine, and neuter, a distinction which is still present even in the plural (unlike Russian and, in part, the Čakavian dialect). They also have two numbers: singular and plural. However, some consider there to be three numbers (paucal or dual, too), since (still preserved in closely related Slovene) after two (dva, dvije/dve), three (tri) and four (četiri), and all numbers ending in them (e.g. twenty-two, ninety-three, one hundred four, but not twelve through fourteen) the genitive singular is used, and after all other numbers five (pet) and up, the genitive plural is used. (The number one [jedan] is treated as an adjective.) Adjectives are placed in front of the noun they modify and must agree in both case and number with it.

There are seven tenses for verbs: past, present, future, exact future, aorist, imperfect, and pluperfect; and three moods: indicative, imperative, and conditional. However, the latter three tenses are typically used only in Shtokavian writing, and the time sequence of the exact future is more commonly formed through an alternative construction.

In addition, like most Slavic languages, the Shtokavian verb also has one of two aspects: perfective or imperfective. Most verbs come in pairs, with the perfective verb being created out of the imperfective by adding a prefix or making a stem change. The imperfective aspect typically indicates that the action is unfinished, in progress, or repetitive; while the perfective aspect typically denotes that the action was completed, instantaneous, or of limited duration. Some Štokavian tenses (namely, aorist and imperfect) favor a particular aspect (but they are rarer or absent in Čakavian and Kajkavian). Actually, aspects "compensate" for the relative lack of tenses, because aspect of the verb determines whether the act is completed or in progress in the referred time.

Phonology

Vowels 
The Serbo-Croatian vowel system is simple, with only five vowels in Shtokavian. All vowels are monophthongs. The oral vowels are as follows:

The vowels can be short or long, but the phonetic quality does not change depending on the length. In a word, vowels can be long in the stressed syllable and the syllables following it, never in the ones preceding it.

Consonants 
The consonant system is more complicated, and its characteristic features are series of affricate and palatal consonants. As in English, voice is phonemic, but aspiration is not.

{| class="wikitable"
|-
! Latin script
! Cyrillic script
! IPA
! Description
! English approximation
|-
! colspan="6" | trill
|-
| style="text-align:center;"| r
| style="text-align:center;"| р
| style="text-align:center;"| 
| alveolar trill
| rolled (vibrating) r as in carramba
|-
! colspan="6" | approximants
|-
| style="text-align:center;"| v
| style="text-align:center;"| в
| style="text-align:center;"| 
| labiodental approximant
| roughly between vortex and war
|-
| style="text-align:center;"| j
| style="text-align:center;"| ј
| style="text-align:center;"| 
| palatal approximant
| year
|-
! colspan="6" | laterals
|-
| style="text-align:center;"| l
| style="text-align:center;"| л
| style="text-align:center;"| 
| alveolar lateral approximant
| light
|-
| style="text-align:center;"| lj
| style="text-align:center;"| љ
| style="text-align:center;"| 
| palatal lateral approximant
| roughly battalion
|-
! colspan="6" | nasals
|-
| style="text-align:center;"| m
| style="text-align:center;"| м
| style="text-align:center;"| 
| bilabial nasal
| man
|-
| style="text-align:center;"| n
| style="text-align:center;"| н
| style="text-align:center;"| 
| alveolar nasal
| not
|-
| style="text-align:center;"| nj
| style="text-align:center;"| њ
| style="text-align:center;"| 
| palatal nasal
| British news or American canyon
|-
! colspan="6" | fricatives
|-
| style="text-align:center;"| f
| style="text-align:center;"| ф
| style="text-align:center;"| 
| voiceless labiodental fricative
| five
|-
| style="text-align:center;" | z
| style="text-align:center;" | з
| style="text-align:center;" | 
| voiced dental sibilant
| zero
|-
| style="text-align:center;"| s
| style="text-align:center;"| с
| style="text-align:center;"| 
| voiceless dental sibilant
| some
|-
| style="text-align:center;"| ž
| style="text-align:center;"| ж
| style="text-align:center;"| 
| voiced postalveolar fricative
| television
|-
| style="text-align:center;" | š
| style="text-align:center;" | ш
| style="text-align:center;" | 
| voiceless postalveolar fricative
| sharp
|-
| style="text-align:center;"| h
| style="text-align:center;"| х
| style="text-align:center;"| 
| voiceless velar fricative
| loch
|-
! colspan="6" | affricates
|-
| style="text-align:center;"| c
| style="text-align:center;"| ц
| style="text-align:center;"| 
| voiceless dental affricate
| pots
|-
| style="text-align:center;"| dž
| style="text-align:center;"| џ
| style="text-align:center;"| 
| voiced postalveolar affricate
| as English jam|-
| style="text-align:center;"| č
| style="text-align:center;"| ч
| style="text-align:center;"| 
| voiceless postalveolar affricate
| as English check|-
| style="text-align:center;"| đ
| style="text-align:center;"| ђ
| style="text-align:center;"| 
| voiced alveolo-palatal affricate
| roughly jeans|-
| style="text-align:center;"| ć
| style="text-align:center;"| ћ
| style="text-align:center;"| 
| voiceless alveolo-palatal affricate
| roughly cheese|-
! colspan="6" | plosives
|-
| style="text-align:center;"| b
| style="text-align:center;"| б
| style="text-align:center;"| 
| voiced bilabial plosive
| book|-
| style="text-align:center;"| p
| style="text-align:center;"| п
| style="text-align:center;"| 
| voiceless bilabial plosive
| top|-
| style="text-align:center;"| d
| style="text-align:center;"| д
| style="text-align:center;"| 
| voiced dental plosive
| dog|-
| style="text-align:center;"| t
| style="text-align:center;"| т
| style="text-align:center;"| 
| voiceless dental plosive
| stop|-
| style="text-align:center;"| g
| style="text-align:center;"| г
| style="text-align:center;"| 
| voiced velar plosive
| good|-
| style="text-align:center;"| k
| style="text-align:center;"| к
| style="text-align:center;"| 
| voiceless velar plosive
| duck|}

In consonant clusters all consonants are either voiced or voiceless. All the consonants are voiced if the last consonant is normally voiced or voiceless if the last consonant is normally voiceless. This rule does not apply to approximantsa consonant cluster may contain voiced approximants and voiceless consonants; as well as to foreign words (Washington would be transcribed as VašinGton), personal names and when consonants are not inside of one syllable.

 can be syllabic, playing the role of the syllable nucleus in certain words (occasionally, it can even have a long accent). For example, the tongue-twister navrh brda vrba mrda involves four words with syllabic . A similar feature exists in Czech, Slovak, and Macedonian.

 Pitch accent 

Apart from Slovene, Serbo-Croatian is the only Slavic language with a pitch accent (simple tone) system. This feature is present in some other Indo-European languages, such as Norwegian, Ancient Greek, and Punjabi. Neo-Shtokavian Serbo-Croatian, which is used as the basis for standard Bosnian, Croatian, Montenegrin, and Serbian, has four "accents", which involve either a rising or falling tone on either long or short vowels, with optional post-tonic lengths:

The tone stressed vowels can be approximated in English with set vs. setting? said in isolation for a short tonic e, or leave vs. leaving? for a long tonic i, due to the prosody of final stressed syllables in English.

General accent rules in the standard language:

 Monosyllabic words may have only a falling tone (or no accent at all – enclitics);
 Falling tone may occur only on the first syllable of polysyllabic words;
 Accent can never occur on the last syllable of polysyllabic words.

There are no other rules for accent placement, thus the accent of every word must be learned individually; furthermore, in inflection, accent shifts are common, both in type and position (the so-called "mobile paradigms"). The second rule is not strictly obeyed, especially in borrowed words.

Comparative and historical linguistics offers some clues for memorising the accent position: If one compares many standard Serbo-Croatian words to e.g. cognate Russian words, the accent in the Serbo-Croatian word will be one syllable before the one in the Russian word, with the rising tone. Historically, the rising tone appeared when the place of the accent shifted to the preceding syllable (the so-called "Neo-Shtokavian retraction"), but the quality of this new accent was different – its melody still "gravitated" towards the original syllable. Most Shtokavian (Neo-Shtokavian) dialects underwent this shift, but Chakavian, Kajkavian and the Old-Shtokavian dialects did not.

Accent diacritics are not used in the ordinary orthography, but only in the linguistic or language-learning literature (e.g. dictionaries, orthography and grammar books). However, there are very few minimal pairs where an error in accent can lead to misunderstanding.

 Orthography 

Serbo-Croatian orthography is almost entirely phonetic. Thus, most words should be spelled as they are pronounced. In practice, the writing system does not take into account allophones which occur as a result of interaction between words:
 bit ćepronounced biće (and only written separately in Bosnian and Croatian)
 od togapronounced otoga (in many vernaculars)
 iz čegapronounced iščega (in many vernaculars)

Also, there are some exceptions, mostly applied to foreign words and compounds, that favor morphological/etymological over phonetic spelling:
 postdiplomski (postgraduate)pronounced pozdiplomskiOne systemic exception is that the consonant clusters ds and dš are not respelled as ts and tš (although d tends to be unvoiced in normal speech in such clusters):
 predstava (show)
 odšteta (damages)

Only a few words are intentionally "misspelled", mostly in order to resolve ambiguity:
 šeststo  (six hundred)pronounced šesto (to avoid confusion with "šesto" [sixth], pronounced the same)
 prstni  (adj., finger)pronounced prsni (to avoid confusion with "prsni"  [adj., chest]), differentiated by tone in some areas (where the short rising tone contrasts with the short falling tone).

 Writing systems 

Through history, this language has been written in a number of writing systems:
 Glagolitic alphabet, chiefly in Croatia.
 Bosančica, Arebica (mostly in Bosnia and Herzegovina).
 Cyrillic script.
 various modifications of the Latin and Greek alphabets.

The Arabic alphabet had been used by Bosniaks; Greek writing is out of use there, and Arabic and Glagolitic persisted so far partly in religious liturgies.

The Serbian Cyrillic alphabet was revised by Vuk Stefanović Karadžić in the 19th century.

The latter digraphs, however, are unused in the literary standard of the language. All in all, this makes Serbo-Croatian the only Slavic language to officially use both the Latin and Cyrillic scripts, albeit the Latin version is more commonly used.

In both cases, spelling is phonetic and spellings in the two alphabets map to each other one-to-one:

The digraphs Lj, Nj and Dž represent distinct phonemes and are considered to be single letters. In crosswords, they are put into a single square, and in sorting, lj follows l and nj follows n, except in a few words where the individual letters are pronounced separately. For instance,  "to outlive" is composed of the prefix  "out, over" and the verb  "to live". The Cyrillic alphabet avoids such ambiguity by providing a single letter for each phoneme: .Đ used to be commonly written as Dj on typewriters, but that practice led to too many ambiguities. It is also used on car license plates. Today Dj is often used again in place of Đ on the Internet as a replacement due to the lack of installed Serbo-Croat keyboard layouts.

Serbian, Bosnian and Montenegrin standards officially use both alphabets, while Croatian uses the Latin only.

Latin script has been rising in popularity in Serbia with the advent of the digital age and Internet in Serbia, whether due to restraints (Cyrillic letters use up twice the space and therefore cost on SMS), accessibility (intention to be readable internationally, as Latin is taught in all four countries speaking the language) or ease of use. This has been perceived by Serbian government officials as a suppression and threat for existence of the national script that is Cyrillic, with the Ministry of Culture and Information of Serbia pushing for more tight language laws on top of those stipulated by the existing Constitution.

Unicode has separate characters for the digraphs lj (Ǉ, ǈ, ǉ), nj (Ǌ, ǋ, ǌ) and dž (Ǆ, ǅ, ǆ).

 Dialects 

South Slavic historically formed a dialect continuum, i.e. each dialect has some similarities with the neighboring one, and differences grow with distance. However, migrations from the 16th to 18th centuries resulting from the spread of Ottoman Empire on the Balkans have caused large-scale population displacement that broke the dialect continuum into many geographical pockets. Migrations in the 20th century, primarily caused by urbanization and wars, also contributed to the reduction of dialectal differences.

The primary dialects are named after the most common question word for what: Shtokavian uses the pronoun što or šta, Chakavian uses ča or ca, Kajkavian (kajkavski), kaj or kej. In native terminology they are referred to as nar(j)ečje, which would be equivalent of "group of dialects", whereas their many subdialects are referred to as dijalekti "dialects" or govori "speeches".

The pluricentric Serbo-Croatian standard language and all four contemporary standard variants are based on the Eastern Herzegovinian subdialect of Neo-Shtokavian. Other dialects are not taught in schools or used by the state media. The Torlakian dialect is often added to the list, though sources usually note that it is a transitional dialect between Shtokavian and the Bulgaro-Macedonian dialects.

The Serbo-Croatian dialects differ not only in the question word they are named after, but also heavily in phonology, accentuation and intonation, case endings and tense system (morphology) and basic vocabulary. In the past, Chakavian and Kajkavian dialects were spoken on a much larger territory, but have been replaced by Štokavian during the period of migrations caused by Ottoman Turkish conquest of the Balkans in the 15th and the 16th centuries. These migrations caused the koinéisation of the Shtokavian dialects, that used to form the West Shtokavian (more closer and transitional towards the neighbouring Chakavian and Kajkavian dialects) and East Shtokavian (transitional towards the Torlakian and the whole Bulgaro-Macedonian area) dialect bundles, and their subsequent spread at the expense of Chakavian and Kajkavian. As a result, Štokavian now covers an area larger than all the other dialects combined, and continues to make its progress in the enclaves where non-literary dialects are still being spoken.

The differences among the dialects can be illustrated on the example of Schleicher's fable. Diacritic signs are used to show the difference in accents and prosody, which are often quite significant, but which are not reflected in the usual orthography.

Neo-Štokavian Ijekavian/Ekavian

 Óvca i kònji

Óvca koja níje ìmala vȕnē vȉd(j)ela je kònje na br(ij)égu. Jèdan je òd njīh vȗkao téška kȍla, drȕgī je nòsio vèliku vrȅću, a trȅćī je nòsio čòv(j)eka.

Óvca rȅče kònjima: «Sȑce me bòlī glȅdajūći čòv(j)eka kako jȁšē na kònju».

A kònji rȅkoše: «Slȕšāj, ȏvco, nȃs sȑca bòlē kada vȉdīmo da čòv(j)ek, gospòdār, rȃdī vȕnu od ovácā i prȁvī òd(j)eću zá se. I ȍndā óvca nȇmā vȉše vȕnē.

Čȗvši tō, óvca pȍb(j)eže ȕ polje.

 Old Štokavian (Orubica, Posavina):

Óvca i kònji

Óvca kòjā nî ìmala vȕnē vȉdla kònje na brîgu. Jèdān od njȉjū vũkō tȇška kȍla, drȕgī nosȉjo vȅlikū vrȅću, a trȅćī nosȉjo čovȉka.

 Óvca kȃza kȍnjima: «Svȅ me bolĩ kad glȅdām kako čòvik na kònju jȁšī».

A kònji kāzȁše: «Slȕšāj, ȏvco, nãs sȑca bolũ kad vȉdīmo da čòvik, gȁzda, prȁvī vȕnu od ovãc i prȁvī rȍbu zá se od njẽ. I ȍndā ōvcȁ néma vȉšē vȕnē.

Kad tȏ čȕ ōvcȁ, ȕteče ȕ polje.

 Čakavian (Matulji near Rijeka):

Ovcȁ i konjı̏

Ovcȁ kȃ ni imȅla vȕni vȉdela je konjȉ na brȇge. Jedȃn je vȗkal tȇški vȏz, drȕgi je nosîl vȅlu vrȅt'u, a trȅt'i je nosîl čovȅka.

Ovcȁ je reklȁ konjȇn: «Sȑce me bolĩ dok glȅdan čovȅka kako jȁše na konjȅ».

A konjȉ su reklȉ: «Poslȕšaj, ovcȁ, nȃs sȑca bolẽ kad vȉdimo da čovȅk, gospodãr dȅla vȕnu od ovãc i dȅla rȍbu zȃ se. I ȍnda ovcȁ nĩma vȉše vȕni.

Kad je tȏ čȕla, ovcȁ je pobȅgla va pȍje.

 Kajkavian (Marija Bistrica):

õfca i kȍjni

õfca tera nı̃je imȅ̩la vȕne vȉdla je kȍjne na briẽgu. Jȇn od nîh je vlẽ̩ke̩l tẽška kȍla, drȕgi je nȍsil vȅliku vrȅ̩ču, a trẽjti je nȍsil čovȅ̩ka.

õfca je rȇkla kȍjnem: «Sȑce me bolĩ kad vîdim čovȅka kak jȃše na kȍjnu».

A kȍjni su rȇkli: «Poslȕhni, õfca, nȃs sȑca bolĩju kad vîdime da čȍve̩k, gospodãr, dȇ̩la vȕnu ot õfci i dȇ̩la oblȅ̩ku zȃ se. I ȏnda õfca nȇma vȉše vȕne.

Kad je to čȗla, õfca je pobȇ̩gla f pȍlje.

 English language

 The Sheep and the Horses

[On a hill,] a sheep that had no wool saw horses, one of them pulling a heavy wagon, one carrying a big load, and one carrying a man quickly.

 The sheep said to the horses: "My heart pains me, seeing a man driving horses".

 The horses said: "Listen, sheep, our hearts pain us when we see this: a man, the master, makes the wool of the sheep into a warm garment for himself. And the sheep has no wool".

 Having heard this, the sheep fled into the plain.

 Division by jat reflex 

A series of isoglosses crosscuts the main dialects. The modern reflexes of the long Common Slavic vowel jat, usually transcribed *ě, vary by location as /i/, /e/, and /ije/ or /je/. Local varieties of the dialects are labeled Ikavian, Ekavian, and Ijekavian, respectively, depending on the reflex. The long and short jat is reflected as long or short */i/ and /e/ in Ikavian and Ekavian, but Ijekavian dialects introduce a ije/je alternation to retain a distinction.

Standard Croatian and Bosnian are based on Ijekavian, whereas Serbian uses both Ekavian and Ijekavian forms (Ijekavian for Bosnian Serbs, Ekavian for most of Serbia). Influence of standard language through state media and education has caused non-standard varieties to lose ground to the literary forms.

The jat-reflex rules are not without exception. For example, when short jat is preceded by r, in most Ijekavian dialects developed into /re/ or, occasionally, /ri/. The prefix prě- ("trans-, over-") when long became pre- in eastern Ijekavian dialects but to prije- in western dialects; in Ikavian pronunciation, it also evolved into pre- or prije- due to potential ambiguity with pri- ("approach, come close to"). For verbs that had -ěti  in their infinitive, the past participle ending -ěl evolved into -io in Ijekavian Neo-Štokavian.

The following are some examples:

 Present sociolinguistic situation 

The nature and classification of Serbo-Croatian has been the subject of long-standing sociolinguistic debate. The question is whether Serbo-Croatian should be called a single language or a cluster of closely related languages.

 Comparison with other pluricentric languages 

Enisa Kafadar argues that there is only one Serbo-Croatian language with several varieties. This has made it possible to include all four varieties in new grammars of the language.Ronelle Alexander, Bosnian, Croatian, Serbian: A Grammar with Sociolinguistic Commentary (2006, The University of Wisconsin Press) Daniel Bunčić concludes that it is a pluricentric language, with four standard variants spoken in Serbia, Croatia, Montenegro, and Bosnia-Herzegovina. The mutual intelligibility between their speakers "exceeds that between the standard variants of English, French, German, or Spanish". "There is no doubt of the near 100% mutual intelligibility of (standard) Croatian and (standard) Serbian, as is obvious from the ability of all groups to enjoy each others' films, TV and sports broadcasts, newspapers, rock lyrics etc." Other linguists have argued that the differences between the variants of Serbo-Croatian are less significant than those between the variants of English, German, Dutch, and Hindustani.

Among pluricentric languages, (ÖNB). Serbo-Croatian was the only one with a pluricentric standardisation within one state. The dissolution of Yugoslavia has made Serbo-Croatian even more of a typical pluricentric language, since the variants of other pluricentric languages are also spoken in different states.

As in other pluricentric languages, all Serbo-Croatian standard varieties are based on the same dialect (the Eastern Herzegovinian subdialect of the Shtokavian dialect) and consequently, according to the sociolinguistic definitions, constitute a single pluricentric language (and not, for example, several Ausbau languages). According to linguist John Bailyn, "An examination of all the major 'levels' of language shows that BCS is clearly a single language with a single grammatical system."

In 2017, numerous prominent writers, scientists, journalists, activists and other public figures from Croatia, Bosnia-Herzegovina, Montenegro and Serbia signed the Declaration on the Common Language, which states that in Croatia, Serbia, Bosnia-Herzegovina and Montenegro a common polycentric standard language is used, consisting of several standard varieties, such as German, English or Spanish. Alt URL

 Contemporary names 

The use of Serbo-Croatian as a linguistic label has been the subject of long-standing controversy. Wayles Browne calls it a "term of convenience" and notes the difference of opinion as to whether it comprises a single language or a cluster of languages. Ronelle Alexander refers to the national standards as three separate languages, but also notes that the reasons for this are complex and generally non-linguistic. She calls BCS (her term for Serbo-Croatian) a single language for communicative linguistic purposes, but three separate languages for symbolic non-linguistic purposes.

The current Serbian constitution of 2006 refers to the official language as Serbian, while the Montenegrin constitution of 2007 proclaimed Montenegrin as the primary official language, but also grants other languages and dialects the right of official use.
 Most Bosniaks refer to their language as Bosnian.
 Most Croats refer to their language as Croatian.
 Most Serbs refer to their language as Serbian.
 Montenegrins refer to their language either as Serbian or Montenegrin.
 Ethnic Bunjevci refer to their language as Croatian or Bunjevac.

The International Organization for Standardization (ISO) has specified different Universal Decimal Classification (UDC) numbers for Croatian (UDC 862, abbreviation hr) and Serbian (UDC 861, abbreviation sr), while the cover term Serbo-Croatian is used to refer to the combination of original signs (UDC 861/862, abbreviation sh). Furthermore, the ISO 639 standard designates the Bosnian language with the abbreviations bos and bs.

While it operated, the International Criminal Tribunal for the former Yugoslavia, which had English and French as official languages, translated court proceedings and documents into what it referred to as "Bosnian/Croatian/Serbian", usually abbreviated as BCS. Translators were employed from all regions of the former Yugoslavia and all national and regional variations were accepted, regardless of the nationality of the person on trial (sometimes against a defendant's objections), on the grounds of mutual intelligibility.

For utilitarian purposes, Serbo-Croatian is often called "naš jezik ("our language") or "naški (sic. "ourish" or "ourian") by native speakers. This term is frequently used to describe Serbo-Croatian by those who wish to avoid nationalistic and linguistic discussions. Native speakers traditionally describe their language as "jedan ali ne jedinstven—"one but not uniform".

 Views of linguists in the former Yugoslavia 

 Serbian linguists 
In 2021, the Board for Standardization of the Serbian Language issued an opinion that Serbo-Croatian is one language, and that it should be referred to as "Serbian language", while "Croatian", "Bosnian" and "Montenegrin" are to be considered merely local names for Serbian language. This opinion was widely criticized by Croatian government and representatives of the Croatian minority in Serbia. Serbian linguist Ranko Bugarski called this opinion "absurd" and "legacy of the 19th century linguistics". He said that Serbo-Croatian should be considered one language in a scientific sense under the "Serbo-Croatian" label, but four different languages in an administrative sense. Legally, Croatian, Bosnian and Montenegrin are all officially recognized minority languages in Serbia. the Serbian Government also officially recognized Bunjevac language as a standard minority language in 2018 and was approved by the Serbian Ministry of Education for learning in schools.

 Croatian linguists 
The opinion of the majority of Croatian linguists is that there has never been a Serbo-Croatian language, but two different standard languages that overlapped sometime in the course of history. However, Croatian linguist Snježana Kordić has been leading an academic discussion on this issue in the Croatian journal Književna republika from 2001 to 2010. In the discussion, she shows that linguistic criteria such as mutual intelligibility, the huge overlap in the linguistic system, and the same dialect basis of the standard language are evidence that Croatian, Serbian, Bosnian and Montenegrin are four national variants of the pluricentric Serbo-Croatian language. (NSK). Igor Mandić states: "During the last ten years, it has been the longest, the most serious and most acrid discussion (…) in 21st-century Croatian culture". Inspired by that discussion, a monograph on language and nationalism has been published.

The view of the majority of Croatian linguists that there is no single Serbo-Croatian language but several different standard languages has been sharply criticized by German linguist Bernhard Gröschel in his monograph Serbo-Croatian Between Linguistics and Politics.

A more detailed overview, incorporating arguments from Croatian philology and contemporary linguistics, would be as follows:

 Serbo-Croatian is a language One still finds many references to Serbo-Croatian, and proponents of Serbo-Croatian who deny that Croats, Serbs, Bosniaks and Montenegrins speak different languages. The usual argument generally goes along the following lines:
 Standard Croatian, Serbian, Bosnian, and Montenegrin are completely mutually intelligible. In addition, they use two alphabets that perfectly match each other (Latin and Cyrillic), thanks to Ljudevit Gaj and Vuk Karadžić. Croats exclusively use Latin script and Serbs equally use both Cyrillic and Latin. Although Cyrillic is taught in Bosnia, most Bosnians, especially non-Serbs (Bosniaks and Croats), favor Latin.
The list of 100 words of the basic Croatian, Serbian, Bosnian, and Montenegrin vocabulary, as set out by Morris Swadesh, shows that all 100 words are identical. According to Swadesh, 81 per cent are sufficient to be considered as a single language.
 Typologically and structurally, these standard variants have virtually the same grammar, i.e. morphology and syntax.
 Serbo-Croatian was standardised in the mid-19th century, and all subsequent attempts to dissolve its basic unity have not succeeded.
 The affirmation of distinct Croatian, Serbian, Bosnian, and Montenegrin languages is politically motivated.
 According to phonology, morphology and syntax, these standard variants are essentially one language because they are based on the same, Štokavian dialect.

 Serbo-Croatian is not a language Similar arguments are made for other official standards which are drawn from identical or nearly identical material bases and which therefore constitute pluricentric languages, such as Malaysian (Malaysian Malay), and Indonesian (together called Malay), or Standard Hindi and Urdu (together called Hindustani or Hindi-Urdu). However, some argue that these arguments have flaws:

 Phonology, morphology, and syntax are not the only dimensions of a language: other fields (semantics, pragmatics, stylistics, lexicology, etc.) also differ slightly. However, it is the case with other pluricentric languages. A comparison is made to the closely related North Germanic languages (or dialects, if one prefers), though these are not fully mutually intelligible as the Serbo-Croatian standards are. A closer comparison may be General American and Received Pronunciation in English, which are closer to each other than the latter is to other dialects which are subsumed under "British English".
 Since the Croatian as recorded in Držić and Gundulić's works (16th and 17th centuries) is virtually the same as the contemporary standard Croatian (understandable archaisms apart), it is evident that the 19th-century formal standardization was just the final touch in the process that, as far as Croatian is concerned, had lasted more than three centuries. The radical break with the past, characteristic of modern Serbian (whose vernacular was likely not as similar to Croatian as it is today), is a trait completely at variance with Croatian linguistic history. In short, formal standardization processes for Croatian and Serbian had coincided chronologically (and, one could add, ideologically), but they have not produced a unified standard language. Gundulić did not write in "Serbo-Croatian", nor did August Šenoa. Marko Marulić and Marin Držić wrote in a sophisticated idiom of Croatian some 300–350 years before "Serbo-Croatian ideology" appeared. Marulić explicitly called his Čakavian-written Judita as u uerish haruacchi slosena ("arranged in Croatian stanzas") in 1501, and the Štokavian grammar and dictionary of Bartol Kašić written in 1604 unambiguously identifies the ethnonyms Slavic and Illyrian with Croatian.

The linguistic debate in this region is more about politics than about linguistics per se.

The topic of language for writers from Dalmatia and Dubrovnik prior to the 19th century made a distinction only between speakers of Italian or Slavic, since those were the two main groups that inhabited Dalmatian city-states at that time. Whether someone spoke Croatian or Serbian was not an important distinction then, as the two languages were not distinguished by most speakers.

However, most intellectuals and writers from Dalmatia who used the Štokavian dialect and practiced the Catholic faith saw themselves as part of a Croatian nation as far back as the mid-16th to 17th centuries, some 300 years before Serbo-Croatian ideology appeared. Their loyalty was first and foremost to Catholic Christendom, but when they professed an ethnic identity, they referred to themselves as "Slovin" and "Illyrian" (a sort of forerunner of Catholic baroque pan-Slavism) and Croatthese 30-odd writers over the span of c. 350 years always saw themselves as Croats first and never as part of a Serbian nation. It should also be noted that, in the pre-national era, Catholic religious orientation did not necessarily equate with Croat ethnic identity in Dalmatia. A Croatian follower of Vuk Karadžić, Ivan Broz, noted that for a Dalmatian to identify oneself as a Serb was seen as foreign as identifying oneself as Macedonian or Greek. Vatroslav Jagić pointed out in 1864:

On the other hand, the opinion of Jagić from 1864 is argued not to have firm grounds. When Jagić says "Croatian", he refers to a few cases referring to the Dubrovnik vernacular as ilirski (Illyrian). This was a common name for all Slavic vernaculars in Dalmatian cities among the Roman inhabitants. In the meantime, other written monuments are found that mention srpski, lingua serviana (= Serbian), and some that mention Croatian. By far the most competent Serbian scientist on the Dubrovnik language issue, Milan Rešetar, who was born in Dubrovnik himself, wrote behalf of language characteristics: "The one who thinks that Croatian and Serbian are two separate languages must confess that Dubrovnik always (linguistically) used to be Serbian."

Finally, the former medieval texts from Dubrovnik and Montenegro dating before the 16th century were neither true Štokavian nor Serbian, but mostly specific a Jekavian-Čakavian that was nearer to actual Adriatic islanders in Croatia.

 Political connotations 
Nationalists have conflicting views about the language(s). The nationalists among the Croats conflictingly claim either that they speak an entirely separate language from Serbs and Bosniaks or that these two peoples have, due to the longer lexicographic tradition among Croats, somehow "borrowed" their standard languages from them. Bosniak nationalists claim that both Croats and Serbs have "appropriated" the Bosnian language, since Ljudevit Gaj and Vuk Karadžić preferred the Neo-Štokavian Ijekavian dialect, widely spoken in Bosnia and Herzegovina, as the basis for language standardization, whereas the nationalists among the Serbs claim either that any divergence in the language is artificial, or claim that the Štokavian dialect is theirs and the Čakavian Croats'— in more extreme formulations Croats have "taken" or "stolen" their language from the Serbs. 

Proponents of unity among Southern Slavs claim that there is a single language with normal dialectal variations. The term "Serbo-Croatian" (or synonyms) is not officially used in any of the successor countries of former Yugoslavia.

In Serbia, the Serbian standard has an official status countrywide, while both Serbian and Croatian are official in the province of Vojvodina. A large Bosniak minority is present in the southwest region of Sandžak, but the "official recognition" of Bosnian is moot. Bosnian is an optional course in first and second grade of the elementary school, while it is also in official use in the municipality of Novi Pazar. However, its nomenclature is controversial, as there is incentive that it is referred to as "Bosniak" (bošnjački) rather than "Bosnian" (bosanski) (see Bosnian language#Controversy and recognition for details).

Croatian is the official language of Croatia, while Serbian is also official in municipalities with significant Serb population.

In Bosnia and Herzegovina, all three standard languages are recorded as official. Confrontations have on occasion been absurd. The academic Muhamed Filipović, in an interview to Slovenian television, told of a local court in a Croatian district requesting a paid translator to translate from Bosnian to Croatian before the trial could proceed.

The International Criminal Tribunal for the former Yugoslavia referred to the language as "Bosnian/Croatian/Serbian", usually abbreviated as BCS. Translators were employed from all regions of the former Yugoslavia and all national and regional variations were accepted, regardless of the nationality of the person on trial (sometimes against a defendant's objections), on the grounds of mutual intelligibility.

 ISO classification 
Since the year 2000, ISO 639 classification recognizes Serbo-Croatian only as a 'macrolanguage', having removed its original codes from ISO 639-1 and ISO 639-2 standards. That left the ISO 639-3 'macrolanguage' (a book-keeping device in the ISO 639-3 standard to keep track of which ISO 639-3 codes correspond with which ISO 639-2 codes) stranded without a corresponding ISO 639-2 code.

 Words of Serbo-Croatian origin Cravat, from French cravate "Croat", by analogy with Flemish Krawaat and German Krabate, from Serbo-Croatian Hrvat, as cravats were characteristic of Croatian dressPolje, from Serbo-Croatian polje "field"Slivovitz, from German Slibowitz, from Bulgarian slivovitza or Serbo-Croatian šljivovica "plum brandy", from Old Slavic *sliva "plum" (cognate with English sloe)Tamburitza, Serbo-Croatian diminutive of tambura, from Turkish, from Persian ṭambūr "tanbur"Uvala, from Serbo-Croatian uvala "hollow"Vampire, from Serbo-Croatian vampir via German Vampir or French Vampire Sample text 
Article 1 of the Universal Declaration of Human Rights in Serbo-Croatian, written in the Latin alphabet:Sva ljudska bića rađaju se slobodna i jednaka u dostojanstvu i pravima. Ona su obdarena razumom i sv(ij)ešću i treba jedni prema drugima da postupaju u duhu bratstva.Article 1 of the Universal Declaration of Human Rights in Serbo-Croatian, written in the Cyrillic script:Сва људска бића рађају се слободна и једнака у достојанству и правима. Она су обдарена разумом и св(иј)ешћу и треба једни према другима да поступају у духу братства.Article 1 of the Universal Declaration of Human Rights in English:All human beings are born free and equal in dignity and rights. They are endowed with reason and conscience and should act towards one another in a spirit of brotherhood. See also 

 Ausbau languages
 Comparison of standard Bosnian, Croatian, Montenegrin and Serbian
 Declaration on the Common Language 2017
 Dialects of Serbo-Croatian
 Language secessionism in Serbo-Croatian
 Pluricentric Serbo-Croatian language
 Serbo-Croatian relative clauses
 Serbo-Croatian kinship

 Notes 

 References 
 Citations 

 Sources 

 
 
 
 
 
 
 
 
  (COBISS-Sr).
  Contents.
 
 
 
 
 
 

 Further reading 

 Banac, Ivo: Main Trends in the Croatian Language Question. Yale University Press, 1984.
 Bunčić, D., 2016. Serbo-Croatian/Serbian: Cyrillic and Latin. Biscriptality: A Sociolinguistic Typology, pp. 231–246.
 Franolić, Branko: A Historical Survey of Literary Croatian. Nouvelles éditions Latines, Paris, 1984.
 Franolić, B., 1983. The development of literary Croatian and Serbian. Buske Verlag.
 
 
 
 
 Ivić, Pavle: Die serbokroatischen Dialekte. the Hague, 1958.
  (COBISS-CG) .
  .
 Magner, Thomas F.: Zagreb Kajkavian dialect. Pennsylvania State University, 1966.
 
  (COBISS-CG) .
 Murray Despalatović, Elinor: Ljudevit Gaj and the Illyrian Movement. Columbia University Press, 1975.
 Spalatin, C., 1966. Serbo-Croatian or Serbian and Croatian?: Considerations on the Croatian Declaration and Serbian Proposal of March 1967. Journal of Croatian Studies, 7, pp. 3–13.
 Zekovic, Sreten & Cimeša, Boro: Elementa montenegrina, Chrestomatia 1/90. CIP, Zagreb 1991.

 External links 

 Ethnologuethe 15th edition of Ethnologue'' (released 2005) shows changes in this area:
 Previous Ethnologue entry for Serbo-Croatian
 Ethnologue 15th Edition report on western South Slavic languages
 Serbian and Croatian alphabets at Omniglot.
 "Serbian, Croatian, Bosnian, Or Montenegrin? Or Just 'Our Language'?", Radio Free Europe, February 21, 2009
 

 
Dialect levelling
Languages of Bosnia and Herzegovina
Languages of Croatia
Languages of Kosovo
Languages of Montenegro
Languages of Serbia
Languages of Slovenia
Languages of Vojvodina
South Slavic languages
Languages written in Cyrillic script
Slavic languages written in Latin script